Ute Geweniger  (later Strauß, born 24 February 1964) is a former  breaststroke  and medley swimmer  who was a leading member of the East German swimming team in the 1980s. She won two Olympic gold medals, in the 100 m breaststroke and 4×100 m medley relay at the 1980 Summer Olympics in Moscow, and set seven individual and two relay world records. She was named by Swimming World Magazine as World Swimmer of the Year in 1983 and as the European Swimmer of the Year in 1981 and 1983. 

In 2005, she admitted that her performance had been supported by doping.

Geweniger was born in Karl-Marx-Stadt, East Germany, and came to prominence when she set a world record in the 100 m breaststroke in qualifying for the East German team for the 1980 Summer Olympics in Moscow. There she captured gold, setting another world record in the process. She then combined with Rica Reinisch, Andrea Pollack and Caren Metschuck to claim gold in the medley relay, also in world record time. In 1981, she broke the 100 m breaststroke world record thrice, and the 200 m individual medley world record, prior to the European Championships in Split, Croatia, Yugoslavia. There she claimed gold in the 100 m and 200 m breaststroke (breaking a world record in the former), 200 m individual medley, medley relay, as well as a silver in the 400 m individual medley behind team-mate Petra Schneider. At the World Championships the following year in Guayaquil, Ecuador, she won gold in both the 100 m breaststroke and the medley relay, combining with Ines Geißler, Birgit Meineke and Kristin Otto to again lower the world record. At the 1983 European Championships in Rome, Italy, she again won the breaststroke double, the 200 m individual medley and the 4×100 m medley relay, setting a world record in the 100 m breaststroke. Geweniger was tipped for further Olympic success, but her career was ended when the Soviet bloc, including East Germany, staged a retaliatory boycott of the 1984 Summer Olympics held in Los Angeles.

References

1964 births
Living people
Sportspeople from Chemnitz
Doping cases in swimming
German sportspeople in doping cases
Olympic swimmers of East Germany
Swimmers at the 1980 Summer Olympics
Olympic gold medalists for East Germany
East German female breaststroke swimmers
East German female medley swimmers
World record setters in swimming
Medalists at the 1980 Summer Olympics
World Aquatics Championships medalists in swimming
European Aquatics Championships medalists in swimming
Olympic gold medalists in swimming
Recipients of the Patriotic Order of Merit in gold